I Love may refer to:
 I Love (Tom T. Hall song)
 I Love (Joyner Lucas song)
 I Love (TV channel), an Indian TV channel
 I Love (EP), an extended play by (G)I-dle